Anderson Byron Holderby Jr. (April 13, 1935 – August 24, 2012) was a rear admiral and Chief of Chaplains of the United States Navy.

Biography
Holderby was born in Norfolk, Virginia. He graduated from the College of William & Mary (A.B., 1957) and the Lutheran Theological Southern Seminary (B.Div., 1963) and became a pastor in Roanoke, Virginia. Holderby later completed a Master of Arts in Counseling (M.A.C.) degree at the University of North Florida in 1976.

Holderby died on August 24, 2012 in Pinehurst, North Carolina and is buried at Arlington National Cemetery.

Military career
Holderby joined the United States Navy in 1967. Later, he was deployed to serve in the Vietnam War. Afterwards, he was stationed at Marine Corps Base Camp Lejeune with the 2nd Marine Division.

After an assignment at Guantanamo Bay Naval Base, Holderby was stationed at Naval Air Station Cecil Field.

From 1985 to 1989, Holderby served as Senior Chaplain of the United States Naval Academy. Afterwards, he joined the Chief of Chaplains Office, where he was tasked with detailing chaplains with their assignments. Later, he became Chaplain of the United States Pacific Fleet. After three years of serving as Deputy Chief of Chaplains, Holderby became Chief of Chaplains in 1997. He remained in the position until his retirement in 2000.

References

External links

1935 births
2012 deaths
Military personnel from Norfolk, Virginia
College of William & Mary alumni
20th-century American Lutheran clergy
People from Roanoke, Virginia
United States Navy chaplains
United States Navy personnel of the Vietnam War
University of North Florida alumni
United States Navy admirals
Chiefs of Chaplains of the United States Navy
People from Pinehurst, North Carolina
Burials at Arlington National Cemetery